Dhumketu in Indic languages is "Comet".

Dhumketu may also refer to:

 Dhumketu (magazine), a fortnightly, edited by Kazi Nazrul Islam
 Dhumketu (writer), pen name for the Gujarati writer, Gaurishankar Govardhandas Joshi
 Dhoomaketu, a 1949 Indian Kannada-language film
 Dhumketu (2016 film), a 2016 Bangladeshi film